Familie Neumann is an East German television series originally broadcast in 1984.

See also
List of German television series

External links
 

1984 German television series debuts
1986 German television series endings
German-language television shows
Television in East Germany